Cristian Francois (born October 2, 1985) is a male beach volleyball and volleyball player from Trinidad and Tobago.

He played in the men's competition at the NORCECA Beach Volleyball Circuit 2007 in Guatemala City, partnering with Sean Morrison and during the 2009 season playing with Kevin Rivers

He won the 2008 National Beach Volleyball Championship playing with Kevin Rivers and the bronze medal at the Sizzlin Sand Beach Volleyball Tour 2008 in Antigua
.

In Indoor volleyball, he participated in the 2006 Central American and Caribbean Games and Pan-American Cup 2008 with his National team.

Awards

Individuals
 2007 Trinidad and Tobago A Division National League "Best Scorer"

Beach
 Trinidad and Tobago Beach Volleyball Championship 2008  Gold Medal
 Trinidad and Tobago Beach Volleyball Championship 2007  Silver Medal
 Sizzlin Sand Beach Volleyball Tour 2008 Antigua  Bronze Medal

References

 

1985 births
Living people
Trinidad and Tobago men's volleyball players
Trinidad and Tobago beach volleyball players
Men's beach volleyball players
Competitors at the 2006 Central American and Caribbean Games